Krishna Bahadur Chhetri was an Indian politician. He was elected to the Lok Sabha, lower house of the Parliament of India from Darjeeling , West Bengal as a member of the Indian National Congress.

References

External links
Official biographical sketch in Parliament of India website

India MPs 1977–1979
1935 births
Lok Sabha members from West Bengal
Year of death missing
Indian Gorkhas
People from Darjeeling district